WQSV-LP is an Adult Album Alternative formatted broadcast radio station licensed to and serving Staunton, Virginia.  WQSV-LP is owned and operated by Staunton Media Alliance.

See also
List of community radio stations in the United States

References

External links
 106.3 WQSV Online
 

2015 establishments in Virginia
Adult album alternative radio stations in the United States
Radio stations established in 2015
QSV-LP
QSV-LP
Community radio stations in the United States